Harold Raymond Powell (7 August 1923 – 7 July 1993) was an Australian rules footballer who played with Essendon in the Victorian Football League (VFL).

Powell was a utility player, often featuring as a half forward flanker. He only twice played more than half the game in a season, with 16 appearances in 1944, followed by 14 games in 1945. His 43 goals in 1944, five of them in the finals, were enough to top Essendon's goal-kicking.

He played for Brunswick from 1947 to 1949 and was then coach of Ascot Vale.

References

External links
 
 
 Ray Powell's playing statistics from The VFA Project

1923 births
Australian rules footballers from Melbourne
Essendon Football Club players
Brunswick Football Club players
1993 deaths
People from Moonee Ponds, Victoria